Howard Earl Gardner (born July 11, 1943) is an American developmental psychologist and the John H. and Elisabeth A. Hobbs Research Professor of Cognition and Education at the Harvard Graduate School of Education at Harvard University. He is currently the senior director of Harvard Project Zero, and since 1995, he has been the co-director of The Good Project.

Gardner has written hundreds of research articles and thirty books that have been translated into more than thirty languages.  He is best known for his theory of multiple intelligences, as outlined in his 1983 book Frames of Mind: The Theory of Multiple Intelligences.

Gardner retired from teaching in 2019. In 2020, he published his intellectual memoir A Synthesizing Mind.

Early life
Howard Earl Gardner was born July 11, 1943, in Scranton, Pennsylvania, to Ralph Gardner and Hilde (née Weilheimer) Gardner, German Jewish immigrants who fled Germany prior to World War II.

Gardner described himself as "a studious child who gained much pleasure from playing the piano". Although Gardner never became a professional pianist, he taught piano from 1958 to 1969.

Education was of the utmost importance in the Gardner home. While his parents had hoped that he would attend Phillips Academy Andover in Massachusetts, Gardner opted to attend a school closer to his hometown in Pennsylvania, Wyoming Seminary.  Gardner had a desire to learn and greatly excelled in school.

Career

Gardner graduated from Harvard College in 1965 with an BA in social relations, and studied under the renowned Erik Erikson. After spending one year at the London School of Economics, he went on to obtain his PhD in developmental psychology at Harvard while working with psychologists Roger Brown and Jerome Bruner, and philosopher Nelson Goodman.

For his postdoctoral fellowship, Gardner worked alongside Norman Geschwind at Boston Veterans Administration Hospital and continued his work there for another 20 years. In 1986, Gardner became a professor at the Harvard Graduate School of Education. Since 1995, much of the focus of his work has been on The GoodWork Project, now part of a larger initiative known as The Good Project that encourages excellence, ethics, and engagement in work, digital life, and beyond.

In 2000, Gardner, Kurt Fischer, and their colleagues at the Harvard Graduate School of Education established the master's degree program in Mind, Brain and Education. This program was thought to be the first of its kind around the world. Many universities in both the United States and abroad have since developed similar programs. Since then, Gardner has published books on a number of topics including Changing Minds: The Art and Science of Changing Our Own and Other People's Minds, Five Minds for the Future, Truth, Beauty and Goodness Reframed, and The App Generation (written with Katie Davis).

In the last decade with Wendy Fischman and several other colleagues, Gardner has been co-directing a major study of higher education in the United States. Information about the study, including several dozen blogs, is available on Gardner's website. In March 2022, MIT Press published Wendy Fischman and Howard Gardner’s book The Real World of College: What Higher Education Is and What It Can Be.

Theory and criticism
According to Gardner's theory of multiple intelligences, humans have several different ways of processing information, and these ways are relatively independent of one another. The theory is a critique of the standard intelligence theory, which emphasizes the correlation among abilities, as well as traditional measures like IQ tests that typically only account for linguistic, logical, and spatial abilities. Since 1999, Gardner has identified eight intelligences: linguistic, logical-mathematical, musical, spatial, bodily/kinesthetic, interpersonal, intrapersonal, and naturalistic. Gardner and colleagues have also considered two additional intelligences, existential and pedagogical. Many teachers, school administrators, and special educators have been inspired by Gardner's theory of multiple intelligences as it has allowed for the idea that there is more than one way to define a person's intellect.

Gardner's definition of intelligence has been met with some criticism in education circles as well as in the field of psychology.  Perhaps the strongest and most enduring critique of his theory of multiple intelligences centers on its lack of empirical evidence, much of which points to a single construct of intelligence called "g". Gardner has responded that his theory is based entirely on empirical evidence as opposed to experimental evidence, as he does not believe experimental evidence in itself can yield a theoretical synthesis.

Gardner's theory of multiple intelligences can be seen as both a departure from and a continuation of the 20th century's work on the subject of human intelligence.  Other prominent psychologists whose contributions variously developed or expanded the field of study include Charles Spearman, Louis Thurstone, Edward Thorndike, and Robert Sternberg.

In 1967, Professor Nelson Goodman started an educational program called Project Zero at the Harvard Graduate School of Education, which began with a focus in arts education and now spans throughout a wide variety of educational arenas. Howard Gardner and David Perkins were founding Research Assistants and later Co-Directed Project Zero from 1972 to 2000. Project Zero's mission is to understand and enhance learning, thinking, and creativity in the arts, as well as humanistic and scientific disciplines at the individual and institutional levels.

For over two decades, in collaboration with William Damon, Mihaly Csikszentmihalyi, and several other colleagues, Gardner has been directing research at The Good Project on the nature of good work, good play, and good collaboration. The goal of his research is to determine what it means to achieve work that is at once excellent, engaging, and carried out in an ethical way. With colleagues Lynn Barendsen, Courtney Bither, Shelby Clark, Wendy Fischman, Carrie James, Kirsten McHugh, and Danny Mucinskas, Gardner has developed curricular toolkits on these topics for use in educational and professional circles.

Achievements and awards
In 1981 Gardner was the recipient of a MacArthur Prize Fellowship. In 1990 he became the first American to receive the University of Louisville Grawemeyer Award in Education.   In 1985, The National Psychology Awards for Excellence in the Media, awarded Gardner The Book Award for Frames of Mind: The Theory of Multiple Intelligences, which was published by Basic Books.  In 1987, he received the William James Award from the American Psychological Association. SUNY Plattsburgh inducted Gardner selected Gardner for honoris causa membership in Omicron Delta Kappa in 1998. In 1999, Gardner received the Golden Plate Award of the American Academy of Achievement. In 2000 he received a fellowship from the John S. Guggenheim Memorial Foundation.  Four years later he was named an Honorary Professor at East China Normal University in Shanghai. In the years 2005 and 2008 he was selected by Foreign Policy and Prospect magazines as one of the top 100 most influential public intellectuals in the world. In 2011, he won the Prince of Asturias Award in Social Sciences for his development of multiple intelligences theory. In 2015, he received the Brock International Prize in Education. In 2020, Gardner received the Distinguished Contributions to Research in Education Award from the American Education Research Association.

He has received 31 honorary degrees from colleges and universities around the world, including institutions in Bulgaria, Canada, Chile, Greece, Hong Kong, Ireland, Israel, Italy, South Korea, and Spain. He is also a member of several honorary societies: American Academy of Arts and Sciences, American Philosophical Society, National Academy of Education, and The American Academy of Political and Social Science.

Personal life
Howard Gardner is married to Ellen Winner, Professor Emerita of Psychology at Boston College. They have one child, Benjamin. Gardner has three children from an earlier marriage: Kerith (1969), Jay (1971), and Andrew (1976); and five grandchildren: Oscar (2005), Agnes (2011), Olivia (2015), Faye Marguerite (2016), and August Pierre (2019).

References

Further reading
 
 
 
 
 
 
 Gordon, L. M. (2006). Howard Gardner. "The encyclopedia of human development." Thousand Oaks: Sage Publications, 2, 552-553.

External links

 The Good Project
The Official Howard Gardner Website
The Official Website of Multiple Intelligences Theory
Howard Gardner Twitter
Project Zero
Faculty Profile — Harvard Graduate School of Education website

1943 births
American business theorists
American developmental psychologists
American educational psychologists
American educational theorists
American textbook writers
Creativity researchers
Intelligence researchers
Harvard College alumni
Harvard Graduate School of Education faculty
Living people
MacArthur Fellows
Members of the American Philosophical Society
New York University faculty
People from Scranton, Pennsylvania
Wyoming Seminary alumni